Cooking With Lasers is the 2002 debut album from The Baldwin Brothers.

Track listing
All songs written and performed by The Baldwin Brothers except where noted.

 "That's Right" – 3:18
 "Funky Junkyard" – 3:25
 "Dream Girl" feat. Miho Hatori – 4:52
 "The Bionic Jam" – 4:02
 "Lava Lamp" – 4:16
 "A Word From Our Sponsor" – 0:20
 "Slowly At First" – 3:37
 "Deep Down" feat. Angie Hart – 3:29
 "Viva Kneivel" – 4:47
 "Urban Tumbleweed" feat Barron Ricks– 3:37
 "Somebody Else's Favorite Song" – 3:41
 "Ether" feat. Geri Soriano-Lightwood – 4:03
 "A Word From The Doctor" – 0:05 
 "Are You There Margaret? It's Me God." – 	3:43

Track 3 written by The Baldwin Brothers, Dave Trumfio and Miho Hatori
Track 4 written by Oliver Nelson
Track 8 written by The Baldwin Brothers and Dave Trumfio
Track 10 written by The Baldwin Brothers and Barron Ricks

12" single "Dream Girl" released February 2002

Side A
1. Dream Girl feat. Miho Hatori
2. Dream Girl [Instrumental]

Side B
3. Dream Girl - Pilgrims of the Mind Re-Mix

Personnel

The Baldwin Brothers
T.J. Widner – Rhodes, synthesizers and programming
Jason Hinkle – Drum kit, electronic bass guitar, synthesizer and programming
Jimmy Deer – Electric and upright bass, guitar and programming
JB Royal – Turntables and programming

Other performers
Featuring:
Miho Hatori – Vocals on track 3
Angie Hart – Vocals on track 8
Geri Soriano-Lightwood – Vocals on track 12
Barron Ricks – Vocals on track 10

Also featuring:
Jesse De La Peña – Turntables
Steve Gillis – Drum kit
Charlie St. Cyr Paul – Drum kit, percussion
Paul Mertens – Piccolo and alto flute; alto, tenor and baritone saxophone
Dave Max Crawford – Trumpet, flugelhorn
Dave Trumfio – Percussion, vocals
Zebulun Barnow (credited as Mr. Bonanza) – Upright bass
Nora O'Connor – Vocals
Chris Moulios – Sampler
Dirty MF and Vice Verse – Vocals

Production
Produced by Dave Trumfio and The Baldwin Brothers
Engineered by Dave Trumfio, Mike Zirkel, Chris Moulios and The Baldwin Brothers
Mastered by Scott Hill, Classic Sound, New York City, New York
A&R by Leonard B. Johnson

Samples
Track four's Bionic Jam uses samples from the television show The Six Million Dollar Man.

References

External links
Baldwin Style, Official Baldwin Brothers Website
Cooking With Lasers, audio samples from the album

The Baldwin Brothers albums
2002 albums